The 2014 Major League Baseball (MLB) First-Year Player Draft was held from June 5 through June 7, 2014, to assign amateur baseball players to MLB teams. The first two rounds were conducted on June 5, followed by rounds three through ten on June 6, and the last 30 rounds on June 7. It was broadcast from Studio 42 of the MLB Network in Secaucus, New Jersey.

The draft order was the reverse order of the 2013 MLB regular season standings. As the Astros finished the 2013 season with the worst record, they had the first overall selection for the third consecutive year. In addition, the Toronto Blue Jays got the 11th pick, as compensation for failing to sign Phil Bickford, the 10th overall selection of the 2013 MLB Draft. The St. Louis Cardinals got bumped from #30 to #31 because although tied with the Boston Red Sox for most wins in the 2013 regular season, the Red Sox had fewer wins in 2012.
Kansas City Royals first round draft pick Brandon Finnegan made his Major League debut on September 6, 2014, the first player to reach the majors from the 2014 draft class, with Carlos Rodon the second. Rodon first appeared for the Chicago White Sox on April 21, 2015. Finnegan became the first player to play in both the College World Series, for TCU, and the MLB World Series, for Kansas City, in the same year. Kyle Schwarber was the first position player to reach the majors from the 2014 draft class doing so June 16, 2015.

First round draft order

Compensatory round

Competitive Balance Round A

Other notable selections

Notes
Compensation picks

Traded picks

See also

List of first overall Major League Baseball draft picks

References

External links
Official Site
2014 Major League Baseball Draft at ESPN

Major League Baseball draft
Draft
Major League Baseball draft
Major League Baseball draft
Baseball in New Jersey
Events in New Jersey
Sports in Hudson County, New Jersey
Secaucus, New Jersey